Erotophilia is a personality trait which assesses an individual's disposition to respond to sexual cues in either a positive or negative manner. It is measured on a continuous scale, ranging from erotophobia to erotophilia.

Erotophobes tend to score higher on authoritarianism and need for achievement, have more traditional sex roles, experience more sex guilt and have more negative reactions to masturbation and homosexuality than erotophiles.

Erotophilic individuals tend to masturbate and fantasize more frequently, think about sex more often, have sexual intercourse for the first time at an earlier age, have more past sexual experiences and have a greater number of intercourse partners than erotophobic individuals. Erotophiles are also more likely to engage in breast self-examinations, schedule regular gynecological visits and engage in preventive behaviors regarding sexually transmitted diseases (e.g., more frequent condom use).

Background 

This dimension of personality is used to assess openness to sex and sexuality. It is an important dimension to measure because of the health and safety risks associated with poor sexual education. Research on this personality dimension has shown a correlation between erotophilia and a more consistent use of contraception, as well as a greater knowledge about human sexuality. The word erotophilia is derived from the name of Eros, the Greek god of romantic love, and philia, an ancient Greek word for love. Researchers occasionally use the term "sex-positive" interchangeably with erotophilia and "sex-negative" interchangeably with erotophobia.

See also
Hypersexuality
Libertine
Promiscuity
Sex-positive movement
Sexual addiction
Sexual ethics
Sexual norm
Sociosexual orientation

References

Human sexuality